Bubble Gum is a South Korean television series starring Lee Dong-wook, Jung Ryeo-won, Lee Jong-hyuk and Park Hee-von. It aired on tvN on Mondays and Tuesdays at 23:00 (KST) time slot beginning October 26, 2015.

Synopsis
Park Ri-hwan (Lee Dong-wook) comes from a wealthy family and he now works as an oriental medical doctor in his own clinic. He grew up with his best friend since childhood, Kim Haeng-ah (Jung Ryeo-won) who works as a radio producer. Haeng-ah's parents both died when she was young and she was taken care by Ri-hwan's mother after her father's death.

Both Ri-hwan and Haeng-ah had feelings for each other but Haeng-ah is taking things slowly due to Ri-hwan's mother who does not want them to be together. 
The story also involves a chaebol, Yi-seul (Park Hee-von) who has feelings for Ri-hwan and Haeng-ah's ex-boyfriend, who is also her senior/director of the company she works in, who wants her back.

Cast

Main
 Lee Dong-wook as Park Ri-hwan
 Yoon Chan-young as young Ri-hwan
 Jung Ryeo-won as Kim Haeng-ah
 Lee Jong-hyuk as Kang Suk-joon
 Park Hee-von as Hong Yi-seul

Supporting
 Bae Jong-ok as Park Sun-young
 Lee Seung-joon as Kwon Ji-hoon
 Kim Ri-na as Noh Tae-hee
 Kim Jung-nan as Oh Se-young
 Lee Moon-soo as Chef Noh
 Park Chul-min as Kim Joon-hyuk 
 Park Won-sang as Jo Dong-il 
 Park Sung-geun as Go Sang-kyu
 Ahn Woo-yeon as Ye Joon-soo 
 Seo Jeong-yeon as Aunt Gong-joo
 Ji Ha-yoon as Lee Jin-ah
 Go Bo-gyeol as Noh Dong-hwa 
 Kim Sa-kwon as Hong Jung-woo 
 Park Joon-geum as Yi-seul's mother

Ratings
In this table,  represent the lowest ratings and  represent the highest ratings.

References

External links
  
 

2015 South Korean television series debuts
2015 South Korean television series endings
TVN (South Korean TV channel) television dramas
South Korean romance television series
Television series by Hwa&Dam Pictures